Prodotia is a genus of sea snails, marine gastropod mollusks in the family Prodotiidae.

Species
Species within the genus Prodotia include:
 Prodotia castanea (Melvill, 1912)
 Prodotia crocata (Reeve, 1846)
 Prodotia iostoma (Gray, 1834)
 Prodotia lannumi (Schwengel, 1950)
 Prodotia townsendi (Melvill, 1918)
Species brought into synonymy
 Prodotia iostomus [sic] accepted as Prodotia iostoma (Gray, 1834)
 Prodotia naevosa (Martens, 1880): synonym of Sinetectula naevosa (E. von Martens, 1880) (new combination)
 Prodotia shepstonensis (Tomlin, 1926): synonym of Sinetectula shepstonensis (Tomlin, 1926) (new combination)

References

Prodotiidae